Pedro Simionato (born 28 March 1938) is a former Argentine cyclist. He competed in the team time trial at the 1960 Summer Olympics.

References

External links
 

1938 births
Living people
Argentine male cyclists
Olympic cyclists of Argentina
Cyclists at the 1960 Summer Olympics
Cyclists from Buenos Aires